Usha Kumari Prashar, Baroness Prashar,  (born 29 June 1948) is a British politician and a crossbench member of the House of Lords. Since the 1970s, she has served as a director or chair of a variety of public and private sector organisations. She became the first chair of the Judicial Appointments Commission upon its creation in April 2006.

Early life and education
Born in Kenya, she came to Yorkshire with her father Naurhia Lal Prashar and family in the 1960s. She was educated at the independent Wakefield Girls' High School, becoming head girl in 1967. Prashar read Politics at Leeds University, graduating in 1970 with a Bachelor of Arts degree, after which she undertook postgraduate studies in Social Administration at the University of Glasgow.

Career

Private Sector
Baroness Prashar was a non-executive director of Channel Four Television Corporation from 1992 to 1999, of UNITE Group plc from 2001 to 2004, and became a non-executive director of ITV plc in February 2005.

Public Sector
Baroness Prashar was executive chair of the Parole Board of England and Wales from October 1997 to October 2000. Having been appointed a Civil Service Commissioner in 1990, she was First Civil Service Commissioner from August 2000 to 2005.

Non-Governmental Sector
Baroness Prashar is a trustee of Cumberland Lodge, an educational charity initiating fresh debate on the burning questions facing society.

Baroness Prashar became a governor of De Montfort University in 1996, and became its chancellor in 2001. She was chair of the National Literacy Trust from 2001 to 2005.  She was appointed a trustee of the BBC World Service Trust in 2002, and was president of the Royal Commonwealth Society. She was Deputy Chair of the British Council.

Baroness Prashar was a director of the Runnymede Trust from 1976 to 1984, a Fellow with the Policy Studies Institute from 1984 to 1986, and a director of the National Council for Voluntary Organisations from 1986 to 1991. She is also a governor of the Ditchley Foundation, which organises conferences in Oxfordshire.

Iraq Inquiry
Since July 2009, Baroness Prashar has served on the Iraq Inquiry. She was sworn of the Privy Council the same year to facilitate access to the classified information related to the Iraq War.

UK Community Foundations
She previously served as the Honorary President of UK Community Foundations (UKCF), the umbrella organisation for all community foundations, providing philanthropic advice to clients and delivering UK-wide grant-making programmes.

Honours and styles

Honours
She was appointed to the Order of the British Empire as a Commander (CBE) in the 1995 New Year Honours, and was made a life peer on 15 July 1999 as Baroness Prashar, of Runnymede, in the County of Surrey.

In 2016, she was awarded honorary Doctor of Law by University of London. Later in 2018, was awarded an honorary Doctor of Literature from Kalinga Institute of Industrial Technology in India.

References

External links
Inaugural Judicial Appointments Commission Chair (GNN announcement, 6 October 2005)
Appointment as non-executive director of ITV plc (8 February 2005)
Announcement of her introduction at the House of Lords House of Lords minutes of proceedings, 26 July 1999
Baroness Prashar's profile on TheyWorkForYou.com
Baroness Prashar's profile on official Iraq Inquiry site
 UK Community Foundations (UKCF)

1948 births
Living people
Kenyan emigrants to the United Kingdom
English Hindus
Alumni of the University of Leeds
Alumni of the University of Glasgow
British politicians of Indian descent
Members of the Privy Council of the United Kingdom
Commanders of the Order of the British Empire
Life peeresses created by Elizabeth II
Prashar, Usha Prashar, Baroness
People associated with De Montfort University
Social Democratic Party (UK) politicians
Kenyan people of Indian descent
English people of Indian descent
People of the British Council
Naturalised citizens of the United Kingdom